"No Deeper Meaning" is a song written by Jay Supreme and Nosie Katzmann, and recorded by German Eurodance band Culture Beat. It was released in June 1991 as the fourth and final single from their first studio album, Horizon (1991). The female vocals are performed by Lana Earl. A CD maxi with new remixes was also available, but it was marketed at the same time as the other media. The song reached number four in the Netherlands and number nine in Portugal. Outside Europe, it charted at number three on the RPM Dance/Urban chart in Canada.

The song is about a woman who goes to a nightclub and doesn't want to start a relationship, she just wants to dance. The chorus samples the 1983 song "Change" by British rock group Tears for Fears.

Critical reception
Larry Flick from Billboard wrote that here, the German act "returns to the festive hip-house sound of earlier hits." He called it "spirited" and added that A-side mixes "should entice mainstreamers, while more adventurous, acid-splashed versions on the flip could generate alternative buzz." Mitchell May from Chicago Tribune named the song a "highlight" of the Horizon album.

Track listings
 CD maxi-single (Europe, 1991)
 "No Deeper Meaning" (Club Mix) – 6:40
 "No Deeper Meaning" (Airplay Mix) – 4:00
 "No Deeper Meaning" (House Mix) – 7:00

 CD maxi-single remix (Germany, 1991)
 "No Depper Meaning" (51 West 52 Street Mix) – 6:55
 "No Depper Meaning" (Technology Mix) – 4:04
 "No Depper Meaning" (Departure Mix) – 1:58

Charts

Weekly charts

Year-end charts

References

1991 singles
1991 songs
Culture Beat songs
Dance Pool singles
English-language German songs
Songs written by Jay Supreme
Songs written by Nosie Katzmann